Mozida Government High School is the only government high school in Tongi, Gazipur Sadar Upazila, Gazipur District, Bangladesh. The school was built in 1988.

References

Tongi
High schools in Bangladesh
Educational institutions established in 1988
1988 establishments in Bangladesh
Education in Gazipur District